SixReps is a social networking website which has fitness enthusiasts as its target market. It is founded by Denny Santoso and Sanny Gaddafi, and its headquarters is in Jakarta, Indonesia. SixReps was launched and first introduced to public by Denny Santoso in an event called Ultimate Body Contest 2010 at Bali, Indonesia on November 21, 2010.

The name of SixReps stands for 6 Repetitions which is important in weight training if one want to build muscle. SixReps users are known as Six'ers. In April 2011, SixReps' average time user spent is 18 minutes, while page views is approximately 426,000 per month.

History 
Denny Santoso already had the idea to create a fitness social network website back in 2006, but the timing was not right. In August 2010, Denny Santoso met Sanny Gaddafi who later became SixReps' CTO, at a local start-up meeting. After hiring a few members for the team and being worked for around 3 weeks, SixReps was ready to launch on November 21, 2010.

In May 2011, SixReps sponsored Ultimate Body Contest Roadshows in Indonesia. This event is limited only to SixReps members. For this event, SixReps provided live streaming service that can be watched by their members.

Features 
SixReps has basic features for social networking website, which are blogs, chat, events, friends, games, photos, and videos. Social networking functions are grouped and based on the user's country. The site also contains a database of selected health clubs worldwide, workout guides, training logs, progress trackers to note personal achievements and measurements, and allows members to upload photos to mark personal milestones. The site also offers a "passport" which can be printed out and used as a membership card to get certain benefits.

References

External links 
 

Blog hosting services
Indonesian social networking websites
Weight training